Zune is a discontinued media management software program for Microsoft Windows that functions as a full media player application with a library, an interface to the Zune Marketplace, and as a media streaming server. The software is used to sync with all devices with Zune functionality including the Zune 4, 8, 16, 30, 80, 120, Zune HD, Windows Phone 7, and Microsoft Kin. Zune devices work exclusively with the Zune software, which applies many design principles of Microsoft's Metro design language.

The software was discontinued on October 16, 2012 and replaced with the Windows Phone App (available both as desktop app and Windows Store app versions) and subsequently the "Phone Companion" App built into Windows 10 for PC, which is used for syncing with devices running Windows Phone 8 (including 8.1) and Windows 10 Mobile, respectively. The software's role as a music and video player and streaming service has been superseded by Groove Music and Microsoft Movies & TV.

Zune online services were completely shut down on November 15, 2015, but the Zune software is still available for download from the Windows Phone website for use with Windows Phone 7 and Zune devices, which do not work with the newer apps designed for Windows Phone 8/8.1/Windows 10 Mobile.

Content
As a media player, the Zune software supports the following formats:

The Zune software organizes the media in its library and allows users to add to the library by ripping from CDs, syncing with a Zune device, and downloading from the Zune Marketplace. The Zune software also allows one to organize song metadata. It can automatically download album art and metadata tag data for content in the library.

On the PC, the Zune software streams files to other PCs, the Xbox 360, and other compatible devices. The Zune software also connects with the Zune social and keeps track of files swapped with other users.

The Zune software runs only on 32-bit Windows XP or 32-bit/64-bit Windows Vista/Windows 7. Windows XP Professional x64 Edition is not supported. The Zune software is also compatible with Windows 8 and Windows 10 so Zune device users would have continued legacy support on the new operating system, despite the Zune brand's phasing out before the 2012 release of the OS.

History

The 0.1 versions of the Zune software were a modified version of Windows Media Player 11 while versions since 2.0 are built independently with additional DirectShow decoders for AAC, MPEG-4 and H.264. The current version of the software is 4.08.2345, released on August 22, 2011. Several versions of the software have been released. As of October 16, 2012 Zune became Xbox Music.

Zune Marketplace
Zune Marketplace was an online store that offered music, podcasts, TV shows, movies, music videos, and mobile applications. Content could be viewed or purchased on Windows PCs with the Zune software installed, Zune devices, the Xbox 360, Windows Phone phones, or the Microsoft Kin phones. Zune Music Marketplace has since been superseded by Xbox Music.

Music
Initially offering 2 million songs, the Zune Marketplace had grown to offer 14 million songs, all of which were available in MP3 format at up to 320kbit/s and were DRM-free. Music on Zune Marketplace was offered by the big four music groups (EMI, Warner Music Group, Sony BMG and Universal Music Group), as well as smaller music labels.

The home page of the Zune Marketplace shows featured music as selected by Microsoft, and the most popular music. Users can search, or filter by genres including rock, pop, dance, urban, and others.

Prior to Zune Marketplace's music becoming DRM-free, songs were protected by Windows Media DRM however the Zune Software only allowed WMDRM content from the Zune Marketplace to be transferred to Zune devices. Zune Marketplace DRM content could be played by other WMDRM compatible applications and devices.

Videos
Zune Marketplace offers television shows from the following companies: A&E, Anime, Bravo, Cartoon Network, CBS, Discovery Communications, E!, Fox, G4, GamerTV, History Channel, Marvel, MLB, NBC, Paley Center, PBS, Spike, Starz, SyFy, TNA, USA Network, and Viacom.

Movies from Paramount, Universal, Warner Brothers, 20th Century Fox and other studios are offered for purchase or time-limited rental. Some movies are available in HD. Selected content purchased via Zune Marketplace on the Xbox 360 additionally offers 5.1 surround sound.

Music videos were also offered for purchase. Zune Video Marketplace has been superseded by Xbox Video.

Applications

Zune Marketplace included an applications section where apps and games could be downloaded for the Zune HD. The store initially launched with nine apps, all of which were developed by Microsoft and released for free. The selection of apps expanded to sixty-two games and applications over two years. Apps that were available included several games, Facebook, Twitter, and Windows Live Messenger. Applications are also available from various independent developers made using XNA Game Studio or OpenZDK, which use C# and C++ respectively. On August 31, 2012, the apps sections of the Zune Marketplace and users' media collections were disabled within the software.

The Zune software also allowed users to browse, purchase, and install Windows Phone apps from Windows Phone Marketplace.

International availability
Zune Marketplace was originally only available in the United States. In October 2010, certain Zune Marketplace content became available in additional countries in North America, Europe, Asia, and Australasia. The following table shows content availability by country:

It has been discovered that there are a number of workarounds for accessing the Zune Pass and other Zune Marketplace capabilities outside of the countries where it has been launched.

Platforms
The Zune software for Windows PCs offers the entire selection of music, podcasts, videos, and applications. The Xbox 360 offers movie and music video downloads, as well as Zune Pass streaming. Zune devices, Windows Phone devices and the Microsoft Kin phones permit the download and streaming of music; Windows Phone devices additionally allow the download of applications.

Pricing
Purchases are made in the Microsoft Points currency, which can also be used to purchase content from Xbox Live and Games for Windows Live marketplaces. The exchange rate is one United States dollar to 80 Microsoft points. Most music tracks are priced at 79 points or 99 points. This works out to US$0.9875 or US$1.24 per song.

Zune Music Pass
Zune Music Pass is a music subscription service, which allows subscribers to download an unlimited number of songs for as long as their subscription is active. The songs can be played on up to 3 Windows PCs and on up to 3 other Zune-compatible devices, but cannot be burned to an audio CD. Songs downloaded using Zune Pass are provided in WMA format at 192kbit/s and are restricted by DRM. Zune Music Pass subscribers in the United States and other select countries were permitted to keep 10 songs per month even after their subscription ended, however the incentive was ultimately discontinued. On October 3, 2011, the Zune Music Pass price was lowered to $9.99/month, and the 10 song credit was removed. On October 15, 2012, Microsoft re-branded Zune as Xbox Music on the Xbox 360 with the promise of a complete rollout on October 26.

See also
Comparison of online music stores
Zune
Zune Social
Xbox Music
Xbox Video
Windows Phone
Xbox 360
IPhone 2G

References

External links

Official Microsoft Download

Zune
Jukebox-style media players
Microsoft software
Mobile software distribution platforms
Online music database clients
Tag editors
Windows CD ripping software
Windows CD/DVD writing software
Windows media players